Hong-Mei Xiao is a Chinese-born American violist. She won first prize at the Geneva International Music Competition, and is a recipient of the Patek Philippe Grand Prize. Hong-Mei Xiao's career as an international soloist comprises critically acclaimed performances in major concert halls and with orchestras of great distinction throughout the world. An award winning recording artist, her CDs have been released by labels such as Delos Productions and Naxos Records.
She was also honored as a United States Artistic Ambassador.

Early life and studies
Hong-Mei Xiao grew up in a musical family. Her father, the renowned composer Xiao Heng, provided her early violin training. Her mother, Guifang Sui, was a music teacher. Throughout her youth she performed in various public venues in China. She attended the Shanghai Conservatory of Music, graduating with highest honors. Xiao received the Asian Cultural Council Award in 1984. She continued her musical training with violist John Graham in the United States, and received her Master of Music degree from the State University of New York at Stony Brook.

Career

Performer
Hong-Mei Xiao has toured throughout Europe, North and South America, and Asia as a soloist, performing in major concert halls such as:
 New York Carnegie Hall Stern Auditorium
 Alice Tully Hall
 Berliner Philharmonie Hall
 Geneva Victoria Hall
 Zurich Tonhalle
 Hungarian State Opera House
 Beijing National Centre for the Performing Arts
 Tokyo Suntory Hall
 Hong Kong Cultural Center
 Shanghai Concert Hall
 Taipei National Concert Hall

She has appeared as a soloist with renowned orchestras including:
 L'Orchestre de la Suisse Romande
 NDR Elbphilharmonie Orchestra
 Budapest Philharmonic Orchestra
 European Union Chamber Orchestra
 Orchestergesellschaft Biel
 Orchestra Sinfonica Siciliana
 Russian Philharmonic Orchestra
 Israel Ra'anana Symphony
 Orquesta Sinfónica del Estado de México
 Budapest Symphony Orchestra MAV
 Japan Philharmonic
 Minnesota Orchestra
 Aspen Music Festival Orchestra
 Shanghai Symphony
 National Taiwan Symphony Orchestra

Playing style

Xiao’s playing style has been referred to by critics as masterful, spectacular, virtuosic, brilliant, expressive, energetic, intelligent, precise, and soulful. Stylistic critiques include:
 “[Xiao] played with the highest measure of ringing warmth of tone and brilliant technique.” -- Berliner Morgenpost (Germany)
 “Her rich tone, her brilliant virtuosity and her sense of phrasing let the music express itself in a pure way." -- Geneva Tribune (Switzerland)
 "Her playing manifested an ideal velvet sonority and a purity of legato in the cantabile passages, and a prestigious and flexible technique with solidity and energy in the virtuoso passages."—The Courier (Switzerland)
 "The solo playing is spectacular on all counts." --  American Record Guide (United States)
 "The winner of the Geneva International music Competition provided us with an overwhelming masterful performance." The Geneva Journal (Switzerland)

Instruments
Xiao's primary performance instrument is a viola made by Mantegazza in 1796 in Milan, Italy.

Discography
A partial list of her recordings includes:
 English Works for Viola and Orchestra, Budapest Symphony Orchestra - Janos Kovacs, Conductor>
 Bloch: Suite for Viola and Orchestra / Baal Shem / Suite Hebraique, Budapest Symphony
 Bartok: Viola Concertos, Budapest Philharmonic Orchestra - Janos Kovacs, Conductor
 Solos: Solo Works of Daniel Asia, Solo works featuring Orange for Solo Viola
 The Art of Viola, Budapest Philharmonic Orchestra - Janos Kovacs, Conductor

Notable awards and recognitions
 1984 Asian Cultural Council Award
 1987 First-prize winner of the Geneva International Music Competition
 1987 Winner of the Patek Philippe Grand Prize
 1988-89 United States Artistic Ambassador
 2013 “Critic’s Choice Award” from American Record Guide for her CD with the Budapest Symphony of Complete Works for Viola and Orchestra by Ernest Bloch

References

Year of birth missing (living people)
Living people
21st-century classical violinists
Chinese classical violists
Chinese emigrants to the United States
American classical violists
Women violists
21st-century violists